Frithia pulchra, the fairy elephant's feet, is a species of flowering plant in the figmarigold family Aizoaceae, endemic to Gauteng Province, South Africa (where it is classified as “Vulnerable” by the IUCN Red List). Its natural habitat is temperate grassland with high summer rainfall. During periods of drought it has the ability to shrink beneath the soil surface, thus avoiding excessive desiccation, but making it extremely difficult to find.

It is named for Frank Frith, a Johannesburg gardener who showed specimens to N.E. Brown, a botanist at Kew Gardens, while on a visit to London, UK, in 1925. The Latin specific epithet pulchra means “beautiful”.

It does not survive frosts, so in temperate areas it needs to be cultivated under glass. In the UK it has gained the Royal Horticultural Society’s Award of Garden Merit.

Gallery

References

External links

2006 IUCN Red List of Threatened Species.   Downloaded on 21 August 2007.

Flora of South Africa
Aizoaceae
Vulnerable plants
Taxa named by N. E. Brown
Taxonomy articles created by Polbot